Below are the squads for the 2000 AFF Championship, hosted by Thailand, which took place between 6 and 18 November 2000.  The players' listed age is their age on the tournament's opening day (6 November 2000).

Group A

Thailand
Coach: Sonephet Withe

Indonesia
Coach: Nandar Iskandar

Myanmar
Coach:  David Booth

Philippines
Coach: Rodolfo Alicante

Group B

Vietnam
Coach:  Alfred Riedl

Malaysia
Coach: Abdul Rahman Ibrahim

Singapore
Coach: Vincent Subramaniam

Cambodia
Coach:  Joachim Fickert

Laos
Coach: Outhensackda Vatthana

References
 Morrison, Neil. "ASEAN ("Tiger") Cup 2000 (Thailand) (Full Info)". RSSSF.

AFF Championship squads
squads